The 2018 election for the San Francisco Board of Education was held on November 6, 2018, to elect the next three commissioners for the San Francisco Board of Education.

Background 
The 2018 San Francisco Board of Education election drew 19 candidates, which was "the most crowded in recent memory" according to San Francisco Chronicle. They originally competed for two seats, with Commissioners Shamann Walton and Hydra Mendoza declining to seek re-election. Walton ran for the District 10 seat on the San Francisco Board of Supervisors while Mendoza opted out for a job with New York State Education Department. Mendoza's last meeting was in the end of September 2018. On October 15, 2018, Mayor of San Francisco London Breed appointed candidate Faauuga Moliga to fill Mendoza's seat for the remaining three months of her term. Moliga was the first Pacific Islander to serve as a citywide official.

Commissioner Emily Murase did not file for reelection in the 2018 San Francisco Board of Education race. This opened up a third seat for the election.

Candidates 

 Alison Collins, educator
 Monica Chinchilla, education advocate
 Alida Fisher, member of the SFUSD’s Community Advisory Committee for Special Education
 Phillip Marcel House
 Phil Kim, consultant and former teacher at the public charter school KIPP
 Paul Kangas, private investigator
 Connor Krone, founder of a high school financial literacy non-profit
 Lex Leifheit, works at San Francisco Office of Economic and Workforce Development
 Gabriela López, bilingual fourth grade teacher
 Li Miao Lovett, academic counselor at CCSF
 Faauuga Moliga, former school social worker
 Michelle Parker, former president of the district parent–teacher association
 Darron A. Padilla, organization development consultant
 Martin Rawlings-Fein, audiovisual technician and leader at Congregation Sha'ar Zahav, a predominantly LGBT synagogue
 Mia Satya, employment specialist at San Francisco LGBT Community Center
 Roger Sinasohn, writer and technology worker
 Lenette Thompson, firefighter and president of the West Portal Elementary PTA
 John D. Trasviña, former law school dean
 Josephine Zhao, paraprofessional educator

On September 10, 2018, candidate Josephine Zhao withdrew from the race amid the resurfacing of previous racist, homophobic, and transphobic remarks made in Cantonese. Zhao was considered a leading candidate, as she fundraised more than her opponents and had support from many prominent San Francisco political figures. Her withdrawal, however, came after the deadline to withdraw; she still appeared on the ballot, and on October 13 supporters of Zhao canvassed at the district's annual enrollment fair.

Election

Endorsements 
The San Francisco Examiner endorsed Alison Collins, Gabriela López, and Faauuga Moliga. The San Francisco Chronicle endorsed Phil Kim, Michelle Parker, and Alida Fisher. The Bay Area Reporter endorsed Martin Rawlings-Fein, Mia Satya, and Faauuga Moliga. The San Francisco Bay Guardian endorsed Allison Collins, Faauuga Molina, and Li Miao Lovett.

Mayor London Breed endorsed Faauuga Moliga, Michelle Parker, Monica Chinchilla, and Josephine Zhao.

Results 
On November 6, 2018, San Francisco residents chose three new members for the Board from among nineteen candidates, with Alison Collins, Gabriela López, and Faauuga Moliga being elected with the most votes.

Lopez became the first bilingual Spanish speaker and youngest woman ever elected to the school board.

Special appointment to replace Matt Haney 
Commissioner Matt Haney was elected to the San Francisco Board of Supervisors in the concurrent 2018 San Francisco Board of Supervisors election in November 2018, which allowed Mayor London Breed to appoint his replacement for the remainder of his term. Haney had recommended that either a Chinese or transgender candidate replace him. 

On November 14, 2018, the Bay Area Reporter published an editorial pushing for Breed to appoint Mia Satya, who had placed 12th in the election, to the open seat, arguing that "it's time for the mayor to appoint a trans person" due to Breed's previous lack of queer appointees. On January 22, 2019, Breed appointed Jenny Lam to Haney's seat on the board. Lam, who had been the Mayor's education adviser for the prior three months, is a social justice advocate as well as a parent and a second generation Chinese-American. It was Breed's fourth appointment as mayor and brought forth questions of potential conflict of interests between having a commissioner who also is serving as education advisor under the mayor. A similar incident occurred when Mayor Gavin Newsom's education advisor Hydra Mendoza was elected to the Board of Education in 2006. Mendoza later became Mayor Ed Lee's education advisor while remaining on the Board of Education.

References 

San Francisco Board of Education
Election Board of Education
Board of Education 2019
San Francisco Board of Education